Edward Metgod (born 19 December 1959 in Amsterdam, Netherlands) is a former Dutch football (soccer) goalkeeper, and current coach of Team VVCS.  He made his debut in Dutch professional football on 13 April 1980 for HFC Haarlem in a competition game against Roda JC losing 1–2. He spent 11 years at Haarlem before finishing his playing career with 7 seasons at Sparta Rotterdam. Metgod was a member of the famous Haarlem team, that competed in the UEFA Cup in the 1982–1983 season, for the first time in the club's history. However, this campaign was to be overshadowed by the Luzhniki disaster.

Metgod is the younger brother of John Metgod, and earned one cap for the Netherlands national football team during his career: on 10 November 1982 against France (1-2).

Metgod managed a number of amateur clubs before becoming assistant manager of AZ Alkmaar in 2002. He went on to manage Telstar in the Dutch Eerste Divisie from 2008 to 2010 before moving to Team VVCS.

References

Living people
1959 births
Dutch footballers
Dutch football managers
Association football goalkeepers
Sparta Rotterdam players
HFC Haarlem players
Eredivisie players
Footballers from Amsterdam
SC Telstar managers
Netherlands international footballers
AZ Alkmaar non-playing staff